György Cziffra Jr. (1943 – 17 November 1981) was a Hungarian conductor. His father was the pianist György Cziffra who had served in the Hungarian forces during World War II, and was arrested for political reasons by communist authorities after World War II. In 1956 the family fled Hungary, settling in France.

He trained as a pianist, but decided to turn to conducting. He and his father worked together on several recordings and live performances.

Cziffra died in a fire at his house in the Paris suburbs. His father was heartbroken, and from that day on he never performed or recorded with an orchestra again.

References

Hungarian conductors (music)
Hungarian male musicians
Male conductors (music)
Hungarian classical pianists
French male conductors (music)
Male classical pianists
1981 deaths
1943 births
Deaths from fire
Accidental deaths in France
20th-century French conductors (music)
20th-century French male musicians